Arthur Félix Silva e Silva (born 20 February 1990) is a Brazilian professional footballer who plays as a centre-back.

Career

Brazil
At the age of 19, Arthur was already played for Paulista in the Campeonato Paulista Segunda Divisão. In 2009, he joined Cruzeiro B and played for the team for two seasons.

He then played for several clubs in the Brazilian League, such as XV de Piracicaba, Barra Mansa, Volta Redonda, Salgueiro Atlético, and Icasa.

Middle East
In the 2015-2016 season, Arthur started his first career in the Asian League, especially in the Middle East. He joined Oman Professional League club Oman Club for three seasons.

After that, he often changed teams starting from Saudi Arabia club Al-Qaisumah, Al-Nahda, and returned to Oman to joined Suwaiq Club.

Indonesia
On 21 June 2021, Arthur moved to Indonesia. Arthur signed one-year contract with Indonesian Liga 1 club Persik Kediri. He made his debut on 27 August, as a starter in a 1–0 defeat to Bali United.

On 13 December 2022, Arthur scored his first goal for the club with the penalty kick in a 1–1 draw over Persebaya Surabaya.

References

External links
 Arthur Félix Silva at Soccerway

1990 births
Brazilian footballers
Living people
Sportspeople from Londrina
Brazilian expatriate footballers
Campeonato Brasileiro Série D players
Campeonato Brasileiro Série C players
Campeonato Brasileiro Série B players
Saudi First Division League players
Oman Professional League players
Liga 1 (Indonesia) players
Esporte Clube XV de Novembro (Piracicaba) players
Volta Redonda FC players
Salgueiro Atlético Clube players
Associação Desportiva Recreativa e Cultural Icasa players
Oman Club players
Al-Qaisumah FC players
Al-Nahda Club (Saudi Arabia) players
Suwaiq Club players
Persik Kediri players
Expatriate footballers in Oman
Expatriate footballers in Saudi Arabia
Expatriate footballers in Indonesia
Brazilian expatriate sportspeople in Oman
Brazilian expatriate sportspeople in Saudi Arabia
Brazilian expatriate sportspeople in Indonesia
Association football defenders